Bhimadole is a village in Bhimadole mandal of Eluru district of the Indian state of Andhra Pradesh. Bhimadole BMD has its own railway station.

Demographics 

 Census of India, Bhimadole had a population of 13669. The total population constitute 6835 males and 6834 females with a sex ratio of 1000 females per 1000 males. 1289 children are in the age group of 0–6 years, with sex ratio of 980. The average literacy rate stands at 75.52%.

Transport
Bhimadole lies on the Gundugolanu-Kovvur road. APS RTC runs busses from Eluru, Dwarakatirumala, Rajahmundry to here. Bhimadole railway station lies on the Chennai-Howrah main line and many passenger trains stop there.

References 

Villages in Eluru district